The Café Terminus was a popular cafe in the late 19th century near the Gare Saint-Lazare, located in Paris, France. It is infamously known as the target of a bomb attack by French Anarchist Émile Henry on February 12, 1894.

History

Cafe Terminus is an aesthetic cafe and cocktail venue that is based in Paris, France, and some other cities around the world. During the day, Terminus' menu will look like that of the Sentinel, with a meticulous selection of house-prepared baked pastries like biscuits and espresso cake early in the day. At lunch, the menu changes to a choice of sandwiches like a Cubano and a dish meat.

Mixed drink and cocktails commence at 2 pm, and highlights a more creative drink menu than that of House of Shields, created by Passetti. Terminus is an old French brand of absinthe, and the spirit found its way into several of the drinks.

The space, planned in association with Jack Dakin, highlights a 22-foot solid bar and contradicting dividers made of vertical stripes of walnut and reflected glass. Passetti says the group was enlivened by Hector Guimard, who outlined the notorious workmanship nouveau Paris Metro stops, however needed to refresh the search for the present day. 49-situate Terminus is at present in delicate opening mode, with a restricted menu.

References

Coffeehouses and cafés in Paris